The 1933 World Table Tennis Championships mixed doubles was the seventh edition of the mixed doubles championship.  

István Kelen and Mária Mednyánszky defeated Sandor Glancz and Magda Gál in the final by three sets to two.

Results

See also
List of World Table Tennis Championships medalists

References

-